HMG box transcription factor BBX also known as bobby sox homolog or HMG box-containing protein 2 is a protein that in humans is encoded by the BBX gene.

Model organisms

Model organisms have been used in the study of BBX function. A conditional knockout mouse line, called Bbxtm1a(EUCOMM)Wtsi was generated as part of the International Knockout Mouse Consortium program, a high-throughput mutagenesis project to generate and distribute animal models of disease to interested scientists.

Male and female animals underwent a standardized phenotypic screen to determine the effects of deletion. Twenty six tests were carried out on homozygous mutant adult mice and four significant abnormalities were observed. A study of body composition found decreases in bone mineral density and content, and a reduction in body length in female mice, while mutants of both sexes showed a reduction in lean body mass. Radiography found that males had abnormal teeth morphology. Females had a decreased heart weight, and both sexes had reduced IgA levels in their plasma.

References

External links

Further reading 
 
 
 
 
 
 
 

Transcription factors
Genes mutated in mice